Michel Lescanne is a French food processing engineer jointly responsible for the invention of the ready-to-use therapeutic food (RUTF) Plumpy'nut in 1996, and presently serves as President and Chief Executive Officer (CEO) of the French pharmaceutical manufacturer Nutriset.

Notes

References

Living people
20th-century French engineers
20th-century French inventors
French company founders
Year of birth missing (living people)